Michael T. Morrissey is a United States Army major general who serves as the director of plans and policy of the United States Space Command. A career air defense artillery officer, he previously commanded the 94th Army Air and Missile Defense Command.

Early life and education
Morrissey is the son of Michelle A. and Coleman Webb of Milford, Delaware. He is a 1986 graduate of Milford High School.

He graduated from Bloomsburg University of Pennsylvania in 1990 with a BA degree in political science. He received an M.A. degree in 2002 from the School of Advanced Military Studies and an M.S. degree in national security in 2012 from the National War College. He also attended a Massachusetts Institute of Technology seminar.

Military career
Morrissey first enlisted in the United States Army Reserve in 1986. In 1990, he received his commission in the United States Army after graduating from Bloomsbury University.

From June 2008 to April 2011, Morrissey commanded the 5th Battalion, 5th Air Defense Artillery Regiment, which operated a counter rocket, artillery, and mortar system in support of Operation Iraqi Freedom and Operation New Dawn.

Morrissey commanded the 31st Air Defense Artillery Brigade from July 2012 to June 2014, when they deployed Operation Enduring Freedom. He was then assigned as a legislative affairs staffer in the Office of the Secretary of Defense until June 2017 when he was reassigned as the United States Army Central director of operations.

On February 2, 2018, Morrissey was promoted to brigadier general. On July 26, 2018, he took command of the 94th Army Air and Missile Defense Command from Sean A. Gainey. He relinquished command on February 11, 2020.

On February 26, 2020, he was assigned to the Missile Defense Agency as the director for test, where he oversaw testing of the RIM-161 Standard Missile 3, Terminal High Altitude Area Defense, and Aegis Combat System. He was promoted to major general on February 25, 2021.

In March 2022, Morrissey was reassigned as the director for plans and policy of the United States Space Command.

Personal life
Morrissey is married to Cynthia "Cindy" Williams, with whom he has two sons.

Dates of promotion

References

Living people
Place of birth missing (living people)
Recipients of the Defense Superior Service Medal
Recipients of the Distinguished Service Medal (US Army)
Recipients of the Legion of Merit
United States Army generals
United States Army personnel of the Gulf War
United States Army personnel of the Iraq War
Year of birth missing (living people)